Loei Airport  is in Loei, the capital city of Loei Province, Thailand.

Airlines and destinations

References

External links
 Loei Airport Homepage

Airports in Thailand
Buildings and structures in Loei province
Airports established in 1954